Jack Boison Nethercutt II (born December 22, 1936) is an American businessman and former professional racing driver. He notably used #102 and competed in the World Sportscar Championship and USAC Road Racing Championship. 

He is the second owner of The Nethercutt Collection and holds the most victories at the Amelia Island Concours d'Elegance.

Early life 
Nethercutt was born on December 22, 1936, the son to entrepreneur J.B. Nethercutt and Dorothy Sykes in Los Angeles, California. He attended the Harvard-Westlake School. Nethercutt graduated from the University of Southern California in 1958.

Racing career 
Nethercutt entered professional auto racing in 1957 beginning with the Lotus Eleven and notably used the number #102 throughout his career. With the Lotus he was featured on the cover of Road & Track Magazine. He raced the Ferrari 500 TRC from 1958 to 1960. 

In 1960 he acquired the Ferrari 250 Testa Rossa and entered the World Sportscar Championship for the 1960 season. Nethercutt finished 1st in class and 3rd overall at the 1960 12 Hours of Sebring with American Pete Lovely. During the following 1961 season at the 1961 12 Hours of Sebring his Ferrari's oil pump broke on the first lap and was disqualified. Competing with the Ferrari 250 TR at the 1960 USAC Road Racing Championship, he and Lovely finished 2nd in class and 3rd overall behind Carroll Shelby and Ken Miles. He won the 1960 3 Hours of Westwood.   

From 1961 to 1963 he switched to a Lotus 19, competing in the Sports Car Club of America and achieved several podiums, including a victory at the 1962 SCCA Divisional. Nethercutt competed in the United States Grand Prix with the vehicle for one season in 1963.

Mirage racecar 
In 1965, Nethercutt would build his custom racecar called the Mirage. The car was known for its strikingly beautiful but late design, with racing experts claiming that if the Mirage was built a couple of years earlier, it would have been internationally competitive. The Mirage was test driven by Ken Miles. Nethercutt and the Mirage were featured on the cover of the Sports Car Graphic Magazine.

World Sportscar Championship results

12 Hours of Sebring

Official results

Nethercutt Collection 
In 2004 he took over The Nethercutt Collection. He re-restored the 1931 Bugatti Type 51 Dubos in 2011. 

He competed in several prestigious Concours d'Elegance competitions around the United States, notably winning the most titles at the Amelia Island Concours d'Elegance in 2005, 2007, 2011, 2013, and 2016.

Personal life 
Nethercutt had two children and later had a divorce. He married Helen Richards for his second marriage and later had three step-grandchildren. 

In the later 1980s to 90s, they owned a luxury restaurant named Boison's near the Las Vegas Strip which won a Best of Las Vegas award from the Las Vegas Review-Journal. He took over Merle Norman Cosmetics in 2004.

References 

1936 births
Living people
American businesspeople
Racing drivers from California
Racing drivers from Los Angeles
12 Hours of Sebring drivers
World Sportscar Championship drivers
University of Southern California alumni
Nethercutt-Richards family